Nanning–Pingxiang high-speed railway is a high-speed railway between Nanning and Pingxiang in Guangxi, China. Rather than being a central government initiative, this project is largely being coordinated at a regional level, in Guangxi.

History
The railway is being built in two sections: Nanning to Chongzuo, and Chongzuo to Pingxiang. Construction on the Nanning to Chongzuo section started on 28 October 2018. Construction on the Chongzuo to Pingxiang section started on 28 September 2020.

Erection of the overhead wires for the Nanning to Chongzuo section began in December 2020.

The Nanning to Chongzuo section was opened on 5 December 2022.

Route
Between Fusui South and Pingxiang East, the line runs roughly parallel to the Hunan–Guangxi railway.

Stations

Future Development
It would connect to railways in northern Vietnam, and this line is seen as the first stage of a high-speed network reaching as far as Singapore, however Vietnam does not have near-future plans to continue the line to Hanoi. Cross-border traffic will therefore be limited to using the slow Hanoi–Đồng Đăng railway.

References

High-speed railway lines in China
Rail transport in Guangxi